Huggen is a surname. Notable people with the surname include:

Thomas Huggen (by 1521–1586), English politician
Mother Huggen, fictional character

See also
Huggan